A triglyceride (TG, triacylglycerol, TAG, or triacylglyceride) is an ester derived from glycerol and three fatty acids (from tri- and glyceride). 
Triglycerides are the main constituents of body fat in humans and other vertebrates, as well as vegetable fat. 
They are also present in the blood to enable the bidirectional transference of adipose fat and blood glucose from the liver, and are a major component of human skin oils.

Many types of triglycerides exist.  One specific classification focuses on saturated and unsaturated types. Saturated fats have no C=C groups; unsaturated fats feature one or more C=C groups. Unsaturated fats tend to have a lower melting point than saturated analogues; as a result, they are often liquid at room temperature.

Chemical structure 

Triglycerides are tri-esters consisting of a glycerol bound to three fatty acid molecules. Alcohols have a hydroxyl (HO–) group. Organic acids have a carboxyl (–COOH) group. Alcohols and organic acids join to form esters. The glycerol molecule has three hydroxyl (HO–) groups and each fatty acid has a carboxyl group (–COOH). In triglycerides, the hydroxyl groups of the glycerol join the carboxyl groups of the fatty acid to form ester bonds:
HOCH2CH(OH)CH2OH  +  RCO2H  +  R′CO2H  +  R″CO2H   →   RCO2CH2CH(O2CR′)CH2CO2R″  +  3H2O

The three fatty acids (RCO2H, R′CO2H, R″CO2H in the above equation) are usually different, as many kinds of triglycerides are known. The chain lengths of the fatty acids in naturally occurring triglycerides vary, but most contain 16, 18, or 20 carbon atoms.  Natural fatty acids found in plants and animals are typically composed of only even numbers of carbon atoms, reflecting the pathway for their biosynthesis from the two-carbon building-block acetyl CoA. Bacteria, however, possess the ability to synthesise odd- and branched-chain fatty acids. As a result, ruminant animal fat contains odd-numbered fatty acids, such as 15, due to the action of bacteria in the rumen.  Many fatty acids are unsaturated; some are polyunsaturated (e.g., those derived from linoleic acid).

Most natural fats contain a complex mixture of individual triglycerides. Because of this, they melt over a broad range of temperatures. Cocoa butter is unusual in that it is composed of only a few triglycerides, derived from palmitic, oleic, and stearic acids in the 1-, 2-, and 3-positions of glycerol, respectively.

Homo- and heterotriglycerides
The simplest triglycerides are those where the three fatty acids are identical. Their names indicate the fatty acid: stearin derived from stearic acid, palmitin derived from palmitic acid, etc.  These compounds can be obtained in three crystalline forms (polymorphs): α, β, and β′, the three forms differing in their melting points.

A triglyceride containing different fatty acids is known as a mixed triglyceride. If the first and third fatty acids on the glycerol differ, then the mixed triglyceride is chiral.

Conformation
The shape of fat and fatty acid molecules is usually not well-defined.  Any two parts of a molecule that are connected by just one single bond are free to rotate about that bond. Thus a fatty acid molecule with n simple bonds can be deformed in n-1 independent ways (counting also rotation of the terminal methyl group).

Such rotation cannot happen across a double bond, except by breaking and then reforming it with one of the halves of the molecule rotated by 180 degrees, which requires crossing a significant energy barrier. Thus a fat or fatty acid molecule with double bonds (excluding at the very end of the chain) can have multiple cis–trans isomers with significantly different chemical and biological properties.  Each double bond reduces the number of conformational degrees of freedom by one.  Each triple bond forces the four nearest carbons to lie in a straight line, removing two degrees of freedom.

It follows that depictions of "saturated" fatty acids with no double bonds (like stearic) having a "straight zig-zag" shape, and those with one cis bond (like oleic) being bent in an "elbow" shape are somewhat misleading.  While the latter are a little less flexible, both can be twisted to assume similar straight or elbow shapes.  In fact, outside of some specific contexts like crystals or bilayer membranes, both are more likely to be found in randomly contorted configurations than in either of those two shapes.

Examples

Stearic acid is a saturated fatty acid (with only single bonds) found in animal fats, and is the intended product in full hydrogenation.

Oleic acid has a double bond (thus being "unsaturated") with cis geometry about midway in the chain; it makes up 55–80% of olive oil.

Elaidic acid is its trans isomer; it may be present in partially hydrogenated vegetable oils, and also occurs in the fat of the durian fruit (about 2%) and in milk fat (less than 0.1%).

Vaccenic acid is another trans acid that differs from elaidic only in the position of the double bond; it also occurs in milk fat (about 1–2%).

Nomenclature

Common fat names
Fats are usually named after their source (like olive oil, cod liver oil, shea butter, tail fat) or have traditional names of their own (like butter, lard, ghee, and margarine). Some of these names refer to products that contain substantial amounts of other components besides fats proper.

Chemical fatty acid names
In chemistry and biochemistry, dozens of saturated fatty acids and of hundreds of unsaturated ones have traditional scientific/technical names usually inspired by their source fats (butyric, caprylic, stearic, oleic, palmitic, and nervonic), but sometimes their discoverer (mead, osbond).

A triglyceride would then be named as an ester of those acids, such as "glyceryl 1,2-dioleate 3-palmitate".

IUPAC
In the general chemical nomenclature developed by the International Union of Pure and Applied Chemistry (IUPAC), the recommended name of a fatty acid, derived from the name of the corresponding hydrocarbon, completely describes its structure, by specifying the number of carbons and the number and position of the double bonds. Thus, for example, oleic acid would be called "(9Z)-octadec-9-enoic acid", meaning that it has an 18 carbon chain ("octadec") with a carboxyl at one end ("oic") and a double bond at carbon 9 counting from the carboxyl ("9-en"), and that the configuration of the single bonds adjacent to that double bond is cis ("(9Z)")  The IUPAC nomenclature can also handle branched chains and derivatives where hydrogen atoms are replaced by other chemical groups.

A triglyceride would then be named according to general ester rules as, for example, "propane-1,2,3-tryl 1,2-bis((9Z)-octadec-9-enoate) 3-(hexadecanoate)".

Fatty acid code
A notation specific for fatty acids with unbranched chain, that is as precise as the IUPAC one but easier to parse, is a code of the form "{N}:{D} cis-{CCC} trans-{TTT}", where {N} is the number of carbons (including the carboxyl one), {D} is the number of double bonds, {CCC} is a list of the positions of the cis double bonds, and {TTT} is a list of the positions of the trans bonds.  Either list and the label is omitted if there are no bonds of that type.

Thus, for example, the codes for stearic, oleic, elaidic, and vaccenic acids would be "18:0", "18:1 cis-9", "18:1 trans-9", and "18:1 trans-11", respectively. The code for α-oleostearic acid, which is "(9E,11E,13Z)-octadeca-9,11,13-trienoic acid" in the IUPAC nomenclature, has the code "18:3 trans-9,11 cis-13"

Classification

By chain length
Fats can be classified according to the lengths of the carbon chains of their constituent fatty acids.  Most chemical properties, such as melting point and acidity, vary gradually with this parameter, so there is no sharp division.   Chemically, formic acid (1 carbon) and acetic acid (2 carbons) could be viewed as the shortest fatty acids; then triformin would be the simplest triglyceride.  However, the terms "fatty acid" and "fat" are usually reserved for compounds with substantially longer chains.

A division commonly made in biochemistry and nutrition is:
 Short-chain fatty acid (SCFA) with fewer than six carbons (e. g. butyric acid).
 Medium-chain fatty acid (MCFA) with 6 to 12 carbons (e.g. capric acid).
 Long-chain fatty acids (LCFA) with 13 to 21 carbons (e.g. petroselinic acid).
 Very long chain fatty acids (VLCFA) with 22 or more carbons (e. g. cerotic acid with 26)
A triglyceride molecule may have fatty acid elements of different lengths, and a fat product will often be a mix of various triglycerides.   Most fats found in food, whether vegetable or animal, are made up of medium to long-chain fatty acids, usually of equal or nearly equal length.

Saturated and unsaturated fats
For human nutrition, an important classification of fats is based on the number and position of double bonds in the constituent fatty acids.  Saturated fat has a predominance of saturated fatty acids, without any double bonds, while unsaturated fat has predominantly unsaturated acids with double bonds.  (The names refer to the fact that each double bond means two fewer hydrogen atoms in the chemical formula. Thus, a saturated fatty acid, having no double bonds, has the maximum number of hydrogen atoms for a given number of carbon atomsthat is, it is "saturated" with hydrogen atoms.)

Unsaturated fatty acids are further classified into monounsaturated (MUFAs), with a single double bond, and polyunsaturated (PUFAs), with two or more.  Natural fats usually contain several different saturated and unsaturated acids, even on the same molecule. For example, in most vegetable oils, the saturated palmitic (C16:0) and stearic (C18:0) acid residues are usually attached to positions 1 and 3 (sn1 and sn3) of the glycerol hub, whereas the middle position (sn2) is usually occupied by an unsaturated one, such as oleic (C18:1, ω–9) or linoleic (C18:2, ω–6).)

While it is the nutritional aspects of polyunsaturated fatty acids that are generally of greatest interest, these materials also have non-food applications. They include the drying oils, such as linseed (flax seed), tung, poppyseed, perilla, and walnut oil, which polymerize on exposure to oxygen to form solid films, and are used to make paints and varnishes.

Saturated fats generally have a higher melting point than unsaturated ones with the same molecular weight, and thus are more likely to be solid at room temperature.  For example, the animal fats tallow and lard are high in saturated fatty acid content and are solids.  Olive and linseed oils on the other hand are unsaturated and liquid.  Unsaturated fats are prone to oxidation by air, which causes them to become rancid and inedible.

The double bonds in unsaturated fats can be converted into single bonds by reaction with hydrogen effected by a catalyst.  This process, called hydrogenation, is used to turn vegetable oils into solid or semisolid vegetable fats like margarine, which can substitute for tallow and butter and (unlike unsaturated fats) can be stored indefinitely without becoming rancid. However, partial hydrogenation also creates some unwanted trans acids from cis acids.

In cellular metabolism, unsaturated fat molecules yield slightly less energy (i.e., fewer calories) than an equivalent amount of saturated fat. The heats of combustion of saturated, mono-, di-, and tri-unsaturated 18-carbon fatty acid esters have been measured as 2859, 2828, 2794, and 2750 kcal/mol, respectively; or, on a weight basis, 10.75, 10.71, 10.66, and 10.58 kcal/ga decrease of about 0.6% for each additional double bond.

The greater the degree of unsaturation in a fatty acid (i.e., the more double bonds in the fatty acid) the more vulnerable it is to lipid peroxidation (rancidity). Antioxidants can protect unsaturated fat from lipid peroxidation.

Cis and trans fats
Another important classification of unsaturated fatty acids considers the cis–trans isomerism, the spatial arrangement of the C–C single bonds adjacent to the double bonds. Most unsaturated fatty acids that occur in nature have those bonds in the cis ("same side") configuration. Partial hydrogenation of cis fats can turn some of their fatty acids into trans ("opposite sides") variety.

Elaidic acid is the trans isomer of oleic acid, one of the most common fatty acids in human diet. The single change of configuration in one double bond causes them to have different chemical and physical properties.  Elaidic acid has a much higher melting point than oleic acid, 45 °C instead of 13.4 °C. This difference is commonly attributed to the supposed ability of the trans molecules to pack more tightly, forming a solid that is more difficult to break apart.

Omega number
Another classification considers the position of the double bonds relative to the end of the chain (opposite to the carboxyl group). The position is denoted by "ω−k" or "n−k", meaning that there is a double bond between carbons k and k+1 counted from 1 at that end.  For example, alpha-Linolenic acid is a "ω−3" or "n−3" acid, meaning that there is a double bond between the third and fourth carbons, counted from that end; that is, its structural formula ends with –CH=CH––.

Examples of saturated fatty acids

Some common examples of fatty acids:
 Butyric acid with 4 carbon atoms (contained in butter)
 Lauric acid with 12 carbon atoms (contained in coconut oil, palm kernel oil, and breast milk)
 Myristic acid with 14 carbon atoms (contained in cow's milk and dairy products)
 Palmitic acid with 16 carbon atoms (contained in palm oil and meat)
 Stearic acid with 18 carbon atoms (also contained in meat and cocoa butter)

Examples of unsaturated fatty acids

 Myristoleic acid C14:1, ω−5, cis-9-tetradecenoic acid
 Sapienic acid C16:1 ω−10, cis-6-Hexadecenoic acid
 Palmitoleic acid C16:1, ω−7 , cis-9-hexadecenoic acid
 Oleic acid C18:1 ω−9, cis-9-octadecenoic acid
 Petroselinic acid C18:1 ω−12,  cis-Octadec-6-enoic acid
 cis-Vaccenic acid, C18:1 ω−7), cis-11-octadecenoic acid
 Vaccenic acid C18:1 ω−7, trans-11-octadecenoic acid
 Elaidic acid 18:1 ω−9, trans-9-octadecenoic acid (trans-oleic acid)
 Linoleic acid
 Linolenic acid
 Paullinic acid C20:1 ω−7, cis-13-eicosenoic acid
 Gadoleic acid C20:1 ω−11, cis-9-icosenoic acid
 Gondoic acid 20:1 ω−9, cis-11-eicosenoic acid
 Erucic acid C22:1 ω−9, cis-15-docosenoic acid
 Brassidic acid C22:1 ω−9, trans-15-docosenoic acid
 Nervonic acid C24:1 ω−9, | cis-15-tetracosenoic acid
 Arachidonic acid

Industrial uses 
Linseed oil and related oils are important components of useful products used in oil paints and related coatings. Linseed oil is rich in di- and tri-unsaturated fatty acid components, which tend to harden in the presence of oxygen. This heat-producing hardening process is peculiar to these so-called drying oils. It is caused by a polymerization process that begins with oxygen molecules attacking the carbon backbone.

Triglycerides are also split into their components via transesterification during the manufacture of biodiesel. The resulting fatty acid esters can be used as fuel in diesel engines. The glycerin has many uses, such as in the manufacture of food and in the production of pharmaceuticals.

Staining 
Staining for fatty acids, triglycerides, lipoproteins, and other lipids is done through the use of lysochromes (fat-soluble dyes).  These dyes can allow the qualification of a certain fat of interest by staining the material a specific color. Some examples: Sudan IV, Oil Red O, and Sudan Black B.

Interactive pathway map

See also 
 Diglyceride acyltransferase, enzyme responsible for triglyceride biosynthesis
 Medium-chain triglycerides
 Lipid profile
 Lipids
 Vertical auto profile

References

External links 
 Lowering Triglycerides (EMedicineHealth.com; October 2020)

 
Lipid disorders
Esters